Guido Manuli (born 11 June 1939) is an Italian cartoon animator, screenwriter and director.

Biography
Born in Cervia, Manuli started working in the animation field in 1960, and was a close collaborator of Bruno Bozzetto for 18 years, working as a gagman, scriptwriter, and director of animation at Bozzetto Films. He co-directed with Bozzetto the shorts Opera (1973) and Striptease (1977), and made his debut as sole director with the science-fiction satirical short Fantabiblical (1977). He directed the animation sequences of Maurizio Nichetti's To Want to Fly (1991), and in 2001 the Giuseppe Verdi's Aida-inspired  animated film Aida of the Trees. Manuli also directed music videos, advertising shorts, openings for television shows.

Selected filmography
 Shorts
 Fantabiblical (1977)
  Count-Down (1979)
 S.O.S. (1979)
 Erection: To Each His Own (1981)
 Only a Kiss (1983)
 Incubus (1985)
 +1 -1 (1987)
 Istruzioni per l’uso (1989)
 Trailer (1993)
 Casting  (1997)
 Loading  (2004) 

 Feature-length films

  To Want to Fly (1991, co-directed with Maurizio Nichetti)
  L'eroe dei due mondi (1994)
  Monster Mash (2000)
 Aida of the Trees (2001)

References

External links
 
 Guido Manuli Animation 

People from the Province of Ravenna
1939 births
Living people
Italian animated film directors
Italian animated film producers
Italian comics artists 
Parody film directors
Flash artists